Ralph Wesley Judd (December 7, 1901 – May 6, 1957) was a professional baseball player.  He was a right-handed pitcher over parts of three seasons (1927, 1929–30) with the Washington Senators and New York Giants.  For his career, he compiled a 3-0 record, with a 3.32 earned run average, and 23 strikeouts in 62⅓ innings pitched.

He was born in Perrysburg, Ohio, and died in Lapeer, Michigan, at the age of 55. He married Rosa Lee Atkins on 14 October 1929 in Birmingham, Jefferson County, Alabama.  They had at least one child, a son, born 9 Jul 1932 in Houston, Harris County, Texas.

References

External links

1901 births
1957 deaths
Washington Senators (1901–1960) players
New York Giants (NL) players
Major League Baseball pitchers
Baseball players from Ohio
Rochester Tribe players
Reading Keystones players
Toronto Maple Leafs (International League) players
Hamilton Clippers players
Springfield Ponies players
Decatur Commodores players
Birmingham Barons players
Peoria Tractors players
Houston Buffaloes players
Rochester Red Wings players
Columbus Red Birds players
Elmira Red Wings players
Syracuse Chiefs players
St. Paul Saints (AA) players
Hazleton Mountaineers players
People from Perrysburg, Ohio
Port Huron Saints players